Daniel Jakob Lindemann (born 16 October 1985) is a German who lives and performs in South Korea as a television personality and marketing manager. He was a cast member in the talk show Non-Summit.

Personal life
He can play the piano, having been trained from the age of 10 until his teens, and releasing a classical music album with songs composed and played on the piano, called Esperance. 

He holds a black belt in both Taekwondo and Hapkido, having trained in Taekwondo since he was 12 when he still lived in his native Germany and earned his black belt there, while the black belt in Hapkido was earned after starting to train Hapkido in a famous Hapkido studio in Seoul, the capital and most populous city in South Korea.

Filmography

Television series

References

External links

1985 births
Living people
German male taekwondo practitioners
German television personalities
German expatriates in South Korea
Hapkido practitioners
Television people from Cologne
University of Bonn alumni
German people of Israeli descent